Blenheim is a historic home located near Spring Mills, in Campbell County, Virginia.  It was built about 1828, and is a -story, five-bay, single-pile, frame I-house dwelling on a brick basement. It is sheathed with beaded weatherboards and covered with a standing-seam sheet metal roof broken by three pedimented dormers. The interior features elaborate, provincially conceived but skillfully executed, woodwork.  Also on the property is a contributing late-19th century frame stable.

It was listed on the National Register of Historic Places in 1979, with a boundary increase in 1994.

References

Houses on the National Register of Historic Places in Virginia
Houses completed in 1828
Houses in Campbell County, Virginia
National Register of Historic Places in Campbell County, Virginia